Reginald John Singer (14 February 1924 – 14 December 2001) was a football (soccer) player who represented New Zealand at international level.

Singer made a solitary official international appearance for the All Whites in a 1–8 loss to Australia on 11 September 1948.

References

External links
Reg Singer at the New Zealand Death Index

1924 births
2001 deaths
New Zealand association footballers
New Zealand international footballers
Stop Out players

Association footballers not categorized by position